One human poll made up the 2011 NAIA football rankings, sometimes called the NAIA Coaches' Poll or the football ratings. Once the regular season was complete, the NAIA sponsored a 16-team playoff to determine the year's national champion. A final poll was then taken after completion of the 2011 NAIA Football National Championship.

Poll release dates 
The poll release dates were:
 April 18, 2011 (Spring)
 August 8, 2011 (Preseason)
 September 12, 2011
 September 19, 2011
 September 26, 2011
 October 3, 2011
 October 10, 2011
 October 17, 2011
 October 24, 2011
 October 31, 2011
 November 7, 2011
 November 13, 2011 (Final)
 December 19, 2011 (Postseason)

Week by week poll

Leading Vote-Getters 
Since the inception of the Coaches' Poll in 1999, the #1 ranking in the various weekly polls has been held by only a select group of teams. Through the end of 2011, the team and the number of times they have held the #1 weekly ranking are shown below. The number of times a team has been ranked #1 in the postseason poll (the national champion) is shown in parentheses.

In 1999, the results of a postseason poll, if one was conducted, are not known. Therefore, an additional poll was presumed, and the #1 postseason ranking has been credited to the postseason tournament champion, the Northwestern Oklahoma State Rangers.

References 

Rankings
NAIA football rankings